Kjenndalsbreen is a glacier in the municipality of Stryn in Vestland, Norway. The  glacier is a side branch of the Jostedalsbreen glacier, and is included in the Jostedalsbreen National Park.

See also
List of glaciers in Norway

References

Glaciers of Vestland
Stryn